The Gwangju World Cup Stadium is a multi-purpose stadium in the South Korean city of Gwangju. It is managed by the Sports Support Division of the Culture & Sports Policy Office of the Gwangju Metropolitan city. Initially the stadium was named Gwangju World Cup Stadium to host some matches of the 2002 FIFA World Cup. To honour the former South Korean national team coach Guus Hiddink, who helped the team advance to the semi-finals, for the first time in its history, by defeating Spain in this stadium, they have also named it the Guus Hiddink Stadium.

It is the home stadium of Gwangju FC of the Korea Professional Football League (K League) and has a capacity of 40,245.

It was also the venue for the 3rd Asia Song Festival, organised by Korea Foundation for International Culture Exchange, in 2006.

It was also the main venue for 2015 Summer Universiade.

2002 FIFA World Cup Matches

References

External links
 Gwangju World Cup Stadium official website 

2002 FIFA World Cup stadiums in South Korea
Football venues in South Korea
Athletics (track and field) venues in South Korea
Sports venues in Gwangju
Gwangju FC
Gimcheon Sangmu FC
Sports venues completed in 2001
K League 1 stadiums
K League 2 stadiums